The Dangerous Lives of Altar Boys is a 2002 American comedy-drama film directed by Peter Care and written by Jeff Stockwell and Michael Petroni based on Chris Fuhrman's 1994 semi-autobiographical coming-of-age novel of the same name. The film stars Emile Hirsch, Kieran Culkin, Jena Malone, Jodie Foster and Vincent D'Onofrio.

The film is about a group of Catholic school friends in the Southern United States in the 1970s who engage in a series of pranks and general mischief. The boys also collaborate on a comic book they call The Atomic Trinity. Interspersed within the film are segments of animated footage based on the comic book.

Fuhrman died of cancer before completing the final revision of the novel. The film, dedicated to his memory, received positive reviews from critics.

Plot
Set in the early 1970s in the suburban town of Savannah, Georgia, the film follows the lives of protagonist Francis Doyle, and three of his friends, Tim Sullivan, Wade Scalisi and Joey Anderson. The four boys all attend a private Catholic school named St. Agatha's, which they detest. The boys rebel by smoking pot, drinking, obsessing over girls, listening to hard rock music and playing pranks on their teachers, such as stealing their school's statue of St. Agatha and keeping it in their clubhouse. The four friends dedicate much of their time to a comic book of their own creation titled The Atomic Trinity in order to escape the monotony and avoid the difficulties in their own lives.

After receiving a love note from Francis, which was actually written by Tim, Margie Flynn becomes a major presence and weaves her way into the lives of these four friends. She and Francis have an obvious connection that progresses into much more. At times, Francis must choose between his friends and Margie, which causes the group of friends to fall apart. The boys' lives are also translated into segments of animation based on the characters of The Atomic Trinity: Brakken, The Muscle, Captain Asskicker and Major Screw; Nunzilla, based on their peglegged, overly repressive Catholic school teacher Sister Assumpta; and Sorcerella, based on Margie Flynn.

After a school field trip to the zoo, Tim and Francis have the idea of playing another prank on Sister Assumpta. They decide to drug the cougar at the local zoo and then transport it to Sister Assumpta's office to scare her. When they learn how serious Tim and Francis are, the other half of the Atomic Trinity wimp out, which leaves an unlikely group of friends consisting of Margie, Tim and Francis. Francis soon learns that Margie had been sexually assaulted by her own brother, Donny. During gym class Donny bullies Tim. Tim, out of pressure and his own impulsive nature, insults Donny for molesting his own sister. He regrets telling Donny, who beats him up, and then tells Francis who becomes angry with him. Donny takes Tim and Francis's comic, The Atomic Trinity, and gives it to the nun. The violent, blasphemous and inappropriate drawings in the notebook cause Tim and Francis to be suspended, pending expulsion from the school.

In an act of final retribution, Tim, Francis, Wade and Joey attempt to steal a cougar to place inside the school to cover up a wrecking of the school they did that night. At the zoo, a makeshift tranquilizer created from several narcotic drugs is used to put the cougar to sleep. The other three boys go down to the gate to retrieve the cougar in a cage, while Tim impulsively climbs over the fence into the cougar's den. He checks to see if the cougar is alive, and happily replies that it is. When the other boys reach the gate to retrieve the cougar, another cougar leaps at Tim, mauling him to death. At Tim's funeral, Francis quotes the poem "The Tyger" by William Blake, whom Sister Assumpta earlier condemned as a "dangerous thinker". Francis places the book at the stolen statue of St. Agatha in their hideout, and starts a new comic series dedicated entirely to the character based on Tim, Skeleton Boy.

Cast
 Emile Hirsch as Francis Doyle
 Kieran Culkin as Tim Sullivan
 Jena Malone as Margie Flynn
 Jodie Foster as Sister Assumpta
 Vincent D'Onofrio as Father Casey
 Jake Richardson as Wade Scalisi
 Tyler Long as Joey Anderson
 Arthur Bridges as Donny Flynn

Production
In order to adapt the book effectively, director Care and producer Jay Shapiro decided to use segments of animation throughout the film. Since most of the book is from Francis' perspective and takes place in his mind, they needed to find a way to stay true to this "internal narrative".  "Animation seemed like a natural way to go in and out of this interior world and use that as the thread that ties everything together," said Shapiro. The sequences were created by Todd McFarlane, and they are visually similar to basic superhero comic strips. Screenwriter Jeff Stockwell helped to create the storyline for the animated sequences.

Cinematography is done by Lance Acord, who also worked on Being John Malkovich and Buffalo '66. Production design was done by Gideon Pointe, who also worked on Buffalo '66, as well as American Psycho.

Casting
The filmmakers said that Emile Hirsch was the first actor they had in mind for the Francis character, as he had the "innocence and naivete" that they were looking for. Similarly, filmmakers believed that Kieran Culkin had a similar personality to Tim. "I think he is going through a lot of similar things [in his own life]," stated Jodie Foster, producer and star of the film.

Neither the filmmakers nor Foster had planned on her also playing the part of the stern Catholic school teacher and headmistress, Sister Assumpta, as well as being a producer. Foster was drawn to the role, and called producing partner Meg LeFauve up with a request to play the part. LeFauve graciously accepted, saying that it's not "traditional casting to see a young beautiful woman in that kind of a role."

Setting
Although the novel by Chris Fuhrman is set in 1970s Savannah, Georgia, the filmmakers wanted a more "universal look" and decided not to specify a place. Principal photography took place in North and South Carolina, and lasted from May to July 2000. There was also a lot of debate about whether the characters should have Southern accents, but to keep with this "universal feeling," the producers decided against any strong accents.

Soundtrack 
The soundtrack was composed by Marco Beltrami and was released in 2002 by Milan Records. Several songs were specifically written and performed for the film by Queens of the Stone Age lead singer Joshua Homme.

 "The Atomic Trinity" – Joshua Homme
 "The Atomic Trinity vs. Heaven's Devils" – Marco Beltrami
 "The Empty House" – Marco Beltrami
 "The Couch" – Marco Beltrami
 "Hanging (aka Ramble Off)" – Joshua Homme
 "Margie's Confession" – Marco Beltrami 
 "The Atomic Trinity vs. Heaven's Devils, Round II" – Marco Beltrami
 "St. Agatha" – Marco Beltrami
 "On the Road Again" – Canned Heat
 "Francis and Margie" – Joshua Homme
 "Stoned" – Joshua Homme
 "Dead Dog, Part II" – Marco Beltrami
 "Skeleton Boy is Born" – Marco Beltrami
 "Do for the Others" – Stephen Stills
 "Story of the Fish" – Marco Beltrami
 "For the Gods / Act Like Cougars" – Marco Beltrami
 "Torn Apart" – Marco Beltrami
 "Someone is Coming" – Marco Beltrami
 "Eulogy" – Marco Beltrami
 "All the Same" – Joshua Homme

Reception 
Rotten Tomatoes gives the film a rating of 76% based on 106 reviews, with an average rating of 6.5/10. The website’s critics consensus states: "The inter-cutting of animation by Spawn's creator, Todd McFarlane, doesn't always work, but the performances by the young actors capture the pains of growing up well." On Metacritic, which assigns a weighted mean rating out of 100 reviews from film critics, the film has a score of 69 out of 100, based on 31 critics, indicating "generally favorable reviews".

Stephen Holden of The New York Times called it a "bracingly truthful" coming-of-age film that "digs into the flaming recesses of the adolescent mind with such acuity, compassion and good humor that it will plummet you back to that painfully awkward age". Holden noted that "the movie struggles to compare the boys' comic-book vision with William Blake's Songs of Innocence and Songs of Experience, [which becomes] its one glaringly off-key note."

Roger Ebert gave the film two and a half stars out of four, calling it "an honorable film with good intentions."  Ebert went on to say that the screenplay is trying too hard to impress and falls short of achieving the "emotional payoff" it is searching for.

A vocal fan of the animated sequences was Armond White of New York Press, who singled them out for praise.

Accolades 
In 2002, director Care won the award for Best New Filmmaker from the Boston Society of Film Critics. In 2003, the film won the Independent Spirit Award for Best First Feature.

References

External links
 
 
 

2002 films
2002 comedy-drama films
2002 directorial debut films
2002 independent films
2000s American films
2000s buddy comedy-drama films
2000s coming-of-age comedy-drama films
2000s English-language films
American buddy comedy-drama films
American coming-of-age comedy-drama films
American films with live action and animation
American independent films
Films about comics
Films about cougars
Films based on American novels
Films scored by Marco Beltrami
Films set in the 1970s
Films shot in North Carolina
Films shot in South Carolina
Films with screenplays by Michael Petroni
Incest in film
Initial Entertainment Group films